Neomallodon is a genus of beetles in the family Cerambycidae. It is monotypic, being represented by the single species Neomallodon arizonicus.

References

Prioninae
Monotypic beetle genera